Dizaj Diz (also Romanized as Dīzaj Dīz; also known as Dizadiz is a city in the Central District of Khoy County, West Azerbaijan province, Iran. At the 2006 census, its population was 7,527 in 1,486 households, when it was a village. The following census in 2011 counted 7,896 people in 2,115 households, by which time the village had been elevated to the status of a city. The latest census in 2016 showed a population of 8,282 people in 2,364 households.

References 

Khoy County

Cities in West Azerbaijan Province

Populated places in West Azerbaijan Province

Populated places in Khoy County